Ivica Duspara (born 29 August 1965) is a Croatian retired football midfielder.

References

1965 births
Living people
Sportspeople from Vinkovci
Association football midfielders
Yugoslav footballers
Croatian footballers
HNK Cibalia players
NK Zadar players
NK Osijek players
FC Linz players
LASK players
NK Hrvatski Dragovoljac players
HNK Šibenik players
Yugoslav First League players
Yugoslav Second League players
Croatian Football League players
Austrian Football Bundesliga players
Croatian expatriate footballers
Expatriate footballers in Austria
Croatian expatriate sportspeople in Austria